Roussillon is one of the historical counties of the former Principality of Catalonia, corresponding roughly to the present-day southern French département of Pyrénées-Orientales (Eastern Pyrenees) save Fenouillèdes.

Roussillon may also refer to:

Places
 County of Roussillon, the medieval entity
 The southern area of the Languedoc-Roussillon, a region of France
 Roussillon Regional County Municipality, Quebec, a municipal county in Quebec, Canada
 Roussillon, Vaucluse, a commune in the Vaucluse department of France
 Roussillon, Isère, a commune in the Isère department of France
 Roussillon-en-Morvan, a commune in the Saône-et-Loire department of France

Other uses
 Roussillon, an alternative name for the Spanish and French wine grape Grenache
Alicante Bouschet, a Portuguese wine grape that is also known as Roussillon
 Countess of Rousillon, Isabella of Majorca
 Rousillon (horse) (1981-2009), a racehorse
 Rousillon Rupes, a scarp on Titania, a moon of Uranus